Mandy K. Leach (born 20 August 1979) is a retired female freestyle swimmer from Zimbabwe. She represented her native African country at the 2000 Summer Olympics in Sydney, Australia. There, as a 200m free-stylist, she passed the preliminary rounds in 2:01.05 and continued into the semi-finals where she ended up in 13th place in the overall-rankings, clocking at 2:00.60 in the semi-finals.

References
sports-reference

1979 births
Living people
Zimbabwean female freestyle swimmers
LSU Lady Tigers swimmers
Swimmers at the 2000 Summer Olympics
Olympic swimmers of Zimbabwe
Swimmers at the 2002 Commonwealth Games
Commonwealth Games competitors for Zimbabwe
White Zimbabwean sportspeople
Zimbabwean people of British descent
African Games gold medalists for Zimbabwe
African Games silver medalists for Zimbabwe
African Games medalists in swimming
African Games bronze medalists for Zimbabwe
Competitors at the 1999 All-Africa Games